Ambulyx tondanoi is a species of moth of the  family Sphingidae. It is known from Sulawesi.

The wingspan is about 47 mm. It is similar to Ambulyx substrigilis. The ground colour of the forewing upperside is light yellowish-brown with darker markings. The forewing underside is bright yellow with a slight scattering of dark dots in the apical half and a prominent light brown circular patch. The hindwing upperside is similar to Ambulyx substrigilis, but the ground colour is lighter and the marginal distal band is heavier. The hindwing underside is bright yellow with a slight scattering of dark dots in the apical half.

References

Ambulyx
Moths described in 1930
Moths of Indonesia